Constellation is the third studio album by American heavy metal band Alabama Thunderpussy, released in 2000.

Critical reception
The Austin Chronicle wrote that "thanks to the addition of acoustic guitars, piano, and organ, the tunes on Constellation are more diverse in character, more adventurous, than those on their previous, turn-up-more-with-each-listen River City Revival."

Track listing
 "Crying Out Loud" - 4:06
 "Ambition" - 4:42
 "1/4 Mile" - 3:07
 "Middle Finger Salute/1271 3106" - 6:28
 "6 Shooter" - 4:43
 "Second Wind" - 2:29
 "Obsari" - 3:20
 "Foul Play" - 4:11
 "Negligence" - 3:39
 "15 Minute Drive'" - 5:16
 "Burden" - 5:17
 "Keepsake" - 5:34
 "Country Song'" - 11:51
 "All I Can Do Is Write About It" (Lynyrd Skynyrd cover; featured on the 2005 Relapse Records reissue)
 "Ambition (Live)" (featured on the 2005 Relapse Records reissue)

Personnel
 Johnny Throckmorton - vocals
 Erik Larson - guitar
 Asechiah "Cleetus LeRoque" Bogden - guitar
 Sam Krivanec - bass
 Bryan Cox - drums
 Nathan Brown - piano, organ
 Ralf Burkhart - backing vocals

References

2000 albums
Alabama Thunderpussy albums